Dwanga Airport (also Dwangwa)  is an airport serving the village of Bowa, Republic of Malawi.

See also
Transport in Malawi

References
Directory of Airports in Malawi

External links

Airports in Malawi